Edmundo O'Gorman (24 November 1906 in Mexico City – 28 September 1995 in Mexico City) was a Mexican writer, historian and philosopher. He is considered as being among the earlier and most influential applicants of historical revisionism to commonly held narratives regarding the Spanish colonial period in Latin America.

Early life and education
O'Gorman was born in Coyoacán, in the southern part of Mexico City. He was the son of painter and mining engineer Cecil Crawford O'Gorman, an Irishman who emigrated to Mexico in 1895, and the great-great-nephew of the first British consul to Mexico City, Charles O'Gorman, who later married a Mexican citizen. He was the younger brother of celebrated architect and painter Juan O'Gorman.

He graduated with a degree in Law (1928) from the Escuela Libre de Derecho. In 1940 he began lecturing in the Philosophy faculty of the Mexico City College. In 1948 he obtained a Masters in Philosophy and in 1951 he completed his doctorate in History with summa cum laude honorific distinction from the National Autonomous University of Mexico (UNAM). While at UNAM, he was at the university's Faculty of Philosophy and Letters, and a researcher at the university's Institute of Historical Research. During his time at UNAM, O'Gorman met and developed relationships  with distinguished Mexican intellectuals and Spanish refugees, such as José Gaos, who would greatly influence his later works.

O'Gorman also lectured at the Universidad Iberoamericana.

Career
Between 1938 and 1952, O'Gorman worked for the Mexican General National Archive. He became a member of the Mexican Academy of the Spanish Language in 1969 and the Mexican Academy of the Corresponding History of the Real of Madrid, corporation of which he was a director from 1972 to 1987.

He resigned after disagreements over concepts such as the "discovery of America", "encounter between two worlds", "cultural fusion" (or "natural mixing"), names he rejected and instead preferred the terms "empowerment", "domination" and others more according with history.

O'Gorman was the author of several historical texts between 1951 and 1986. O'Gorman published his first works and studies in the "Alcancía" along with his close friend Justino Fernández.

He was a great admirer of authors such as José Ortega y Gasset, Wilhelm Dilthey, Benedetto Croce, Martin Heidegger, among other history writers who kept disagreement with former Mexican historiography, which was full of extremism and with a leaning towards new, unedited documents.

Achievements
Premio Nacional de Letras in (1974)
Premio Historia Rafael Heliodoro Valle (1983)
Premio UNAM a la Docencia (1986). 
Member of the Academia Mexicana de la Historia (1964).
Member of the Academia Mexicana de la Lengua (1969). 
Received honoris causa Ph. Ds at the Universidad Nacional Autónoma de México y de la Universidad Iberoamericana.
Emeritus professor of the Sistema Nacional de Investigadores and the UNAM y member of the Junta de Gobierno.
Led the Academia Mexicana de la Historia (1972–1987).

Books
 Destierro de Sombras (1986)
 La incógnita de la llamada "Historia de los indios de la Nueva España", atribuida a Fray Toribio Motolinia (1982)
 México el trauma de su historia (1977)
 Guías de las actas del cabildo de la ciudad de México. Siglo XVI (1970)
 50 años de revolución (1962)
 La supervivencia política novohispana (1961)
 Invención de América (1958)
 Coautor de Precedentes y sentido de la revolución de Ayutla (1954)
 Fundamentos de la historia de América (1951)
 Dos concepciones de la tarea histórica (1951)

References

External links
 Profile at the Mexican Academy of the Spanish Language 
 https://txarchives.org/utlac/finding_aids/00047.xml 
Irish-Mexican brothers: Edmundo and Juan O'Gorman at the Society for Irish Latin American Studies.

1906 births
1995 deaths
Writers from Mexico City
Mexican people of Irish descent
National Autonomous University of Mexico alumni
Members of the Mexican Academy of Language
20th-century Mexican historians
20th-century Mexican lawyers
20th-century Mexican male writers
20th-century Mexican philosophers